Nikola "Kole" Čašule (March 2, 1921 – September 22, 2009) was a Macedonian-Yugoslavian essayist, dramatist, short story writer and ambassador. Chashule was one of the founders of the Macedonian Writers' Association and served as the organization's president.

Čašule was born as Nikola Kepev in the town of Prilep, Kingdom of Yugoslavia, in the present-day North Macedonia. From 1938 till the beginning of the World War II, he studied medicine at the University of Belgrade. In May 1941, together with other students from Vardar Macedonia, he left for Sofia to continue his studies. There he met Nikola Vaptsarov, Venko Markovski and Todor Pavlov. He was a member of the partisan communist group that started the communist resistance against Bulgarian occupation on October 11, 1941 in Prilep. In 1942, Čašule was arrested and sentenced in Bulgaria to death, as the organizer of an assassination attempt against the former IMRO activist Mane Machkov. His sentence was commuted to life imprisonment and he was imprisoned in Idrizovo near Skopje. In 1944, he joined the guerrilla units. In 1946, Čašule and Lazar Mojsov, as members of the judicial council, sentenced Metodija Andonov-Čento to 11 years in prison.

Čašule worked as the editor of two Macedonian magazines, Nov den and Sovremenost. He also served as the director of Radio Skopje and the Drama Director for the Macedonian National Theatre. Casule was named an honorary member of the Macedonian Academy of Sciences and Arts. Čašule was the recipient of several major Yugoslavian awards, including the Marin Drzić for dramatic work, the July 4 award, the Sterijina nagrada, the October 11 award, the Stale Popov and the Misla, which he was awarded for his entire body of work.

Additionally, Chashule diplomatically represented Yugoslavia. He was Yugoslavia's ambassador to Bolivia, Brazil and Peru. He also served as a consul to Canada.

Kole Chashule died on September 22, 2009, at the age of 88.

Notable works
 1948 – An Evening (Edna večer)
 1950 – The Collective (Zadruga)
 1957 – Twig in the Wind (Vejka na vetrot)
 1958 – Furrow (Brazda)
 1960 – Darkness (Crnila)
 1962 – The Game (Igra)

References

1921 births
2009 deaths
Yugoslav writers
Yugoslav Partisans members
Macedonian writers
Magazine editors
Macedonian dramatists and playwrights
Macedonian diplomats
Ambassadors of Yugoslavia to Brazil
Ambassadors of Yugoslavia to Bolivia
Ambassadors of Yugoslavia to Peru
20th-century dramatists and playwrights
People from Prilep